Michael Edward O'Malley (born October 31, 1966) is an American actor. Born in Boston and raised in New Hampshire, O'Malley hosted the early 1990s children's game show Nickelodeon Guts before moving to Los Angeles later that decade to star in his own sitcom for NBC called The Mike O'Malley Show. He is best known for his role as Jimmy Hughes on Yes, Dear, a CBS series which aired from 2000 to 2006. He was nominated for an Emmy Award for his role as Burt Hummel on the Fox series Glee.

O'Malley has also guest-starred in series including My Name Is Earl, Raising Hope, Parenthood and Parks and Recreation, and has appeared in films including 28 Days, Deep Impact, Leatherheads, Eat, Pray, Love, R.I.P.D., Concussion and Sully.

O'Malley is also a published playwright whose plays include Three Years From Thirty and Diverting Devotion. He adapted another play called Searching for Certainty for Peter Askin's film Certainty, which premiered at the Boston Film Festival in 2011. O'Malley was also a writer on Showtime's comedy-drama Shameless.

O'Malley was the creator and an executive producer of the Starz series Survivor's Remorse, which ran for four seasons between 2014 and 2017.  He has recently been a regular on the TNT series Snowpiercer based on the movie of the same name.

Early life
O'Malley was born in Boston, Massachusetts, and raised in Nashua, New Hampshire. His mother Marianne was a career counselor and father Tony O'Malley an executive in the defense industry.

O'Malley graduated from Bishop Guertin High School in Nashua, New Hampshire in 1984, and from the University of New Hampshire in 1988, where he studied theater. He is also a member of the Kappa Sigma fraternity.

Career

Television 
O'Malley's first role came as the host of Nickelodeon children's game show Get the Picture when he was 24 years old, later moving on to Nickelodeon Guts and later Global GUTS from 1992 to 1995. On the advice of Marc Summers, O'Malley moved to Los Angeles after the cancellation of GUTS to further pursue his acting career. O'Malley starred in Life with Roger, a series which aired from 1996 to 1997. In 1999, two of thirteen filmed episodes of The Mike O'Malley Show aired before the show was canceled. During the 1990s, he also appeared as "The Rick", a character in a series of ads for the ESPN network. In 2018, The Rick made a return in ads for the ESPN+ streaming service.

From 2000 to 2006, O'Malley starred as Jimmy Hughes on the CBS comedy Yes, Dear. He later reprised this role in 2013 on the sitcom Raising Hope. Along with Yes, Dear costar Anthony Clark, O'Malley appeared in the Alan Jackson music video "The Talkin' Song Repair Blues". From 2000 to 2002, O'Malley also provided the voice of Darryl MacPherson for The WB's Baby Blues.

In 2006, O'Malley made a guest appearance on My Name Is Earl as a police officer with bowling aspirations, and made several more guest appearances on the show. In 2008, O'Malley appeared in the NBC drama My Own Worst Enemy.

In 2008, O'Malley became the spokesman for Time Warner Cable's digital cable. In 2009, O'Malley began playing the recurring character, Burt Hummel, the father of a gay student, on Glee. The role lead to Entertainment Weekly'''s Tim Stack to say, "If Mike O'Malley doesn't win an Emmy for playing Burt Hummel, I will be sorely disappointed." Chris Colfer, who plays Burt's son Kurt, has credited his off-screen relationship with O'Malley with improving the quality of their scenes together.

Beginning in 2010, O'Malley portrayed a recurring character on Parenthood. He also hosted The World's Funniest Office Commercials in 2010. On July 8, 2010, O'Malley received a nomination for the Primetime Emmy Award for Outstanding Guest Actor – Comedy Series for playing Burt Hummel on Glee. Prior to its second season, O'Malley was made a series regular on Glee. On August 8, 2010, O'Malley won the Teen Choice Award for Best Parental Unit. He returned to recurring guest star status for the show's third season.

 Film 
O'Malley made his movie debut in the 1998 film Deep Impact, playing Elijah Wood's astronomy teacher. He followed that with a supporting role in the comedy Pushing Tin. In 2000, he portrayed Oliver, a drug addict in rehab, in the film 28 Days. In 2005, O'Malley appeared in the film The Perfect Man. In 2007, he had supporting roles in Leatherheads and Meet Dave.

O'Malley was interviewed in the film City of Champions: The Best of Boston Sports.

In 2009, O'Malley participated in the American documentary film The People Speak. In the film, he performed in a segment with political activist Staceyann Chin.

O'Malley's feature work also includes roles in Eat Pray Love, Cedar Rapids, Concussion and Sully.

 Writing and producing
O'Malley is a playwright with two of his plays, Three Years from Thirty and Diverting Devotion, having been published and produced Off-Broadway. In 2003, a third play, Searching for Certainty was produced in Los Angeles.

He served as the Director for the series finale episode of Yes, Dear, in which he starred.

He later wrote the screenplay for the film Certainty, which is based on Searching for Certainty. The movie began production on May 24, 2010, directed by Peter Askin and produced by O'Malley, along with Will Battersby and Per Melita. Certainty premiered at the Boston Film Festival on September 16, 2011, where it won the Best Screenplay, Best Editing, and Best Ensemble Cast awards.

He was also a writer and consulting producer on the Showtime comedy-drama series Shameless.

O'Malley co-wrote the book for the musical Escape to Margaritaville featuring the songs of Jimmy Buffett with Greg Garcia. The show ran on Broadway from February to July 2018.

He created the Starz basketball comedy series Survivor's Remorse and serves as the show's writer and producer with his production company O'Malley Ink. He is also an executive producer as well as the showrunner for the series Heels, with a recurring role as Charlie Gully, a rival wrestling promoter.

 Other media work 
Along with Anthony Clark, his Yes, Dear co-star, he appeared in Alan Jackson's 2005 music video for "The Talkin' Song Repair Blues".

In 2007, O'Malley kept a blog on Yahoo! Sports, which followed the Boston Red Sox throughout their journey in the MLB playoffs, which was eventually capped off by their World Series title.

 Personal life 
O'Malley resides in Los Angeles with his wife Lisa. They have three children.

Kerry O'Malley, his younger sister, is an actress and Broadway veteran. The siblings co-starred in the first season of Snowpiercer.

A long time fan of Boston band Buffalo Tom, O'Malley is a close friend of lead singer Bill Janovitz. They have often supported causes together. O'Malley requested that the band create a title song for his own short-lived television show The Mike O'Malley Show, as well as for the sitcom Yes, Dear which he co-starred on. According to O'Malley, his love of the band was shared with his wife and was "the glue" that kept them together during their long-distance relationship.

O'Malley is a Boston Red Sox fan, and in May 2006, threw out the first pitch at a game in Fenway Park. He is also an avid fan of the NHL's Boston Bruins and the NFL's New England Patriots.

O'Malley returned to his graduating alma mater'' in 2006 to deliver the commencement speech to the university's 136th graduating class. He also received an honorary degree.

Filmography

Film

Television

References

External links 

1966 births
Living people
20th-century American male actors
21st-century American male actors
Male actors from Boston
Male actors from New Hampshire
American bloggers
20th-century American dramatists and playwrights
American game show hosts
American male film actors
American male television actors
American male voice actors
People from Nashua, New Hampshire
University of New Hampshire alumni
Comedians from Massachusetts
20th-century American comedians
21st-century American comedians
American male bloggers
Bishop Guertin High School alumni